The Supreme Court of the Islamic Emirate of Afghanistan has appointed 69 provisional judges for various courts across the country on 15 December 2021.

Judges

See also
 List of current provincial governors in Afghanistan
 List of current provincial deputy governors in Afghanistan
 List of current provincial police chiefs in Afghanistan

References

Supreme Court of Afghanistan
Sharia judges
Afghan judges
Judiciary of Afghanistan
Law enforcement in the Islamic Republic of Afghanistan